Boal and Harnois was an architectural firm active from 1901 until 1907 in Colorado. Theodore Davis Boal (1867-1938) and Frederick Louis Harnois (1872-1921) were its partners. The firm created the Ferguson-Gano House (1897), the Grant-Humphreys Mansion (1902), other buildings located in Denver, and Osgood Castle (1903) in Redstone.

References

Defunct architecture firms based in Colorado